Burkina Faso is divided into thirteen regions, forty-five provinces, and 351 departments.

Since 2012, every department includes now a single commune (municipality) covering all urbanized areas in the department and representing its population for local elections (by village, or by urban sector within cities and towns). Two very populated departments  (Ouagadougou and Bobo-Dioulasso) are also further subdivided into arrondissements, which split their capital city (and also cover all surrounding villages): their urban commune have a specific status.

The thirteen regions are:

Boucle du Mouhoun
Cascades
Centre
Centre-Est
Centre-Nord
Centre-Ouest
Centre-Sud
Est
Hauts-Bassins
Nord
Plateau-Central
Sahel
Sud-Ouest

 
Burkina Faso
Burkina Faso